Cladobotryum elegans is a species of fungi in the family Hypocreaceae.

References

External links 

 
 Cladobotryum elegans at Mycobank

Hypocreaceae
Fungi described in 1952